The Harenna mouse (Mus harennensis) is a species of mouse in the subgenus Nannomys found in the Harenna Forest, Bale Mountains National Park, southern Ethiopia.

References

Mus (rodent)
Endemic fauna of Ethiopia
Mammals of Ethiopia
Bale Mountains
Mammals described in 2022